Paurophleps reducta is a moth in the  subfamily Arctiinae. It is found in Mozambique.

References

Natural History Museum Lepidoptera generic names catalog

Endemic fauna of Mozambique
Lithosiini
Moths of Sub-Saharan Africa